The Alpine A310 is a sports car built by French manufacturer Alpine, from 1971 to 1984.


History
Dieppe-based Alpine, once an independent company specialising in faster Renaults, later a Renault subsidiary, established a fine competition history with the Alpine A110 winning the 1973 Monte Carlo Rally and World Rally Championship. The successor was the Alpine A310, initially powered by tuned 17TS/Gordini four-cylinder engine, still rear-mounted. The maximum power reaches , thanks to the use of two twin-barrel 45 DCOE Weber carburetors.

The first model of the A310, built 1971-1976, was a car with a four-cylinder engine and six headlights. Being larger, heavier, and no more powerful than its predecessor, the A310 was generally considered underpowered. The car was first shown at the 1971 Geneva Motor Show. The prototype A310 had louvres across the rear windscreen; these were not carried over to the production model. Early models had a NACA duct mounted near the window atop the left front fender, later four-cylinder cars received two, mounted closer to the front of the car. In 1976, to help flagging sales, the lower-cost A310 SX was presented. This model has a  version of the Renault 16/17's 1647 cc inline-four and simplified equipment.

The basis of the A310 was a hefty tubular steel backbone chassis, clothed in a fiberglass shell. As for the previous A110 the entire body was molded in a single piece. Like the ill-fated DeLorean, which used the same PRV powertrain, the engine was mounted longitudinally in the rear, driving forward to the wheels through a manual five-speed gearbox. The driving position was low and sporty, although the front wheelwells encroached on the occupants' feet, pointing them towards the centre of the car. The A310 was labor-intensive, having been developed for small-scale artisanal production - a car took 130 hours to build from start to finish. The front axle also came in for some criticism, although in 1974 the balljoint mountings were replaced by rubber/steel bushings (silent-blocs) which somewhat improved durability. While many components of the A310 came from the Renault parts shelf as expected, others are more surprising - the steering rack is from the Peugeot 504, while the turn signals are Simca 1301 units.

A310 V6

In 1976 the A310 was restyled by Robert Opron and fitted with the more powerful and newly developed 90-degree 2664 cc V6 PRV engine, as used in some Renaults, Volvos and Peugeots. The later V6 received a black plastic rear spoiler as well, useful for keeping the tail planted but somewhat marring the purity of the original's lines. With  on tap, the A310 PRV V6 was Renault's performance flagship capable of 220 km/h (137 mph) and acceptable acceleration. The tail-heavy weight distribution gave handling characteristics similar to the contemporary Porsche 911. Sales did pick up, more than doubling those of the four-cylinder predecessor, but then tapered off as production continued without any updates to make it a serious Porsche competitor in the marketplace. Sales were predominantly in France, with 781 cars sold in its home market in 1979 (its best year). By 1984 less than five hundred Alpines were sold in France, while Porsche sold about 1600 in spite of industrial strikes in Germany.

Beginning with model year 1981 (in late 1980), the rear suspension was shared with the mid-engined Renault 5 Turbo. Rather than the previous three-lug wheels, the A310 also received the alloys used for the 5 Turbo, albeit without the painted elements.

In the later models (1983-1984) of the A310 a "Pack GT" which was inspired from the Group 4 A310 racing cars would be developed, it gained wheel arches and larger spoilers front and rear.

Competition

The A310 had great success in French motorsport as a Group 4 car. In 1977 Guy Frequelin (Alpine Renault A 310-V6) won the French Rally championship.

Production

Production models

A310 4-cylinder model variants

1971–1976
A310 1600 Series 1 (55 L fuel tank, 3 stud suspension, four-cylinder engine, 5-speed transmission)

A310 V6 model variants

1977–1984

Production numbers

References

External links

A310
Group 4 (racing) cars
1980s cars
Cars introduced in 1971
Automobiles with backbone chassis
Rear-engined vehicles